The Army Aviation Badge also known as the "Philippine Army Aviator's Badge" is awarded by the Commander, Armor Division, PA to Commissioned Officers and Enlisted Aircrew of the Army Aviation Regiment, Military Officers and Enlisted Personnel attached to the Army Aviation Regiment, Civilian Personnel, Foreign and Local Dignitaries. The badge is awarded to military personnel who qualify as military aviators and aircrew and are attached to the Army Aviation Regiment, PA.

Description
The Badge is the Seal of the Philippine Army superimposed over a pair of silver wings.

Gallery

See also
 Awards and decorations of the Armed Forces of the Philippines
 United States Aviator Badge

References 
Citations

Bibliography
 The Army Adjutant General, Philippine Army Awards and Decorations Manual FC 1-0062, 2005, OTAAG.
 The AFP Adjutant General, The AFP Awards and Decorations Handbook, 1995, 1997, OTAG. 

Military awards and decorations of the Philippines